52nd Anti-Aircraft Brigade may refer to:

 52nd Light Anti-Aircraft Brigade (United Kingdom), a British Army formation, 1939–1944
 52nd (London) Anti-Aircraft Brigade, the post-World War II redesignation of 26th (London) Anti-Aircraft Brigade
 52nd (London) Anti-Aircraft Brigade, Royal Garrison Artillery, the original title of 52nd (London) Heavy Anti-Aircraft Regiment, Royal Artillery